Volumfestivalen was a cultural festival held in Elverum, Innlandet in Norway that contained music, literature, art, performing arts and film. The festival was first held in 2003. June 2018  saw the last year of the festival, and it was cancelled due to years of decrease in ticket sales. The festival provided a venue for both the student, emerging and professional artists and cultural mediators linked to Hedmark. Past acts at Volumfestivalen include: The Wombats, Cezinando, Unge Ferrari, Kristian Kristensen, Team Me, Ludvig Moon, Frida Ånnevik and Ingrid Olava.

The festival was run voluntarily by young people from around the Hedmark area. In 2010, Volumfestivalen received the Elverum Municipality Culture award.

Events 
Volumfestivalen was held in Elvarheim Park and about ten other venues in the center of Elverum. The festival started in 2003 and since 2009 it became an annual event. In 2011 the festival had about 1,600 visitors, and in 2012 it passed 2000 visitors.

The festival also accommodated seminars, a trade fair and a separate category for children.

Key people in 2012 
Chairman : Henry Leeves
Director : Sven Arild Storberget
Economy: Lars-Ivar Hoelstad

External links 
Official Homepage
Volumfestivalen on Facebook

References 

Music festivals in Norway
Culture in Hedmark
Film festivals in Norway
Elverum
Music festivals established in 2003
Summer events in Norway